The Arauá River is a river of Amazonas state in north-western Brazil. It is a tributary of the Aripuanã River.

Course

The Arauá River runs through the  Juma Sustainable Development Reserve, created in 2006.
It merges into the Aripuanã shortly before the latter merges into the Madeira River.

See also
List of rivers of Amazonas

References

Sources

Rivers of Amazonas (Brazilian state)